Eva Marshal (1203–1246) was a Cambro-Norman noblewoman and the wife of the powerful Marcher lord William de Braose. She was the daughter of William Marshal, 1st Earl of Pembroke, and the granddaughter of Strongbow and Aoife of Leinster.

She held de Braose lands and castles in her own right following the public hanging of her husband by the orders of Llywelyn the Great, Prince of Wales.

Family and marriage 
Lady Eva was the 8th child of William Marshal. Eva and her sisters were described as being handsome, high-spirited girls. From 1207 to 1212, Eva and her family lived in Ireland. Her paternal grandparents were John Marshal and Sibyl of Salisbury, and her maternal grandparents were Richard de Clare, 2nd Earl of Pembroke, known to history as Strongbow and Aoife of Leinster, for whom she was probably named. 

Sometime before 1221, she married Marcher lord William de Braose, who in June 1228 succeeded to the lordship of Abergavenny, and by whom she had four daughters. William was the son of Reginald de Braose and his first wife Grecia Briwere. He was much hated by the Welsh who called him Gwilym Ddu or Black William.

Issue
 Isabella de Braose (b.1222), married Prince Dafydd ap Llywelyn. She died childless.
   Maud de Braose (1224–1301), in 1247, she married Roger Mortimer, 1st Baron Wigmore, by whom she had issue, including Edmund Mortimer, 2nd Baron Mortimer and Isabella Mortimer, Countess of Arundel.
 Eva de Braose (1227 – 28 July 1255), married William de Cantelou, by whom she had issue.
   Eleanor de Braose (c.1228 – 1251). On an unknown date after August 1241, she married Humphrey de Bohun. They had two sons, Humphrey de Bohun, 3rd Earl of Hereford and Gilbert de Bohun, and one daughter, Alianore de Bohun. All three children married and had issue. Eleanor was buried in Llanthony Secunda Priory.

Widowhood 
Eva's husband was publicly hanged by Llywelyn the Great, Prince of Wales on 2 May 1230 after being discovered in the Prince's bedchamber together with his wife Joan, Lady of Wales. Several months later, Eva's eldest daughter Isabella married the Prince's son, Dafydd ap Llywelyn, as their marriage contract had been signed prior to William de Braose's death. Prince Llywelyn wrote to Eva shortly after the execution, offering his apologies, explaining that he had been forced to order the hanging due to the insistence by the Welsh lords. He concluded his letter by adding that he hoped the execution would not affect their business dealings.

Following her husband's execution, Eva held de Braose lands and castles in her own right. She is listed as holder of Totnes in 1230, which she held until her death. It is recorded on the Close Rolls (1234–1237) that Eva was granted 12 marks by King Henry III of England to strengthen Hay Castle. She had gained custody of Hay as part of her dower.

In early 1234, Eva was caught up in her brother Richard's rebellion against King Henry and possibly acted as one of the arbitrators between the King and her mutinous brothers following Richard's murder in Ireland. This is evidenced by the safe conduct she received in May 1234, thus enabling her to speak with the King. By the end of that month, she had a writ from King Henry granting her seisen of castles and lands he had confiscated from her following her brother's revolt. Eva also received a formal statement from the King declaring that she was back in "his good graces again".

She died in 1246 at the age of forty-three.

Ancestry

Notes

References

Sources 

 de Braose family genealogy
 Cokayne, G. E. The Complete Peerage
 Costain, Thomas B. (1959). The Magnificent Century. Garden City, New York: Doubleday and Company, Inc.

Daughters of British earls
1203 births
1246 deaths
People from Pembrokeshire
13th-century Welsh nobility
13th-century Welsh women